Kevin Alexander Harrison (born December 24, 1981 in Belleville, Michigan) is a former American football linebacker for the Buffalo Bills of the National Football League. He was originally signed by the Cleveland Browns as an undrafted free agent in 2005. He played college football at Eastern Michigan.

Professional career
Harrison was placed on injured reserve on October 11, 2007 by the Buffalo Bills due to a knee injury.

References

External links
 

1981 births
Living people
People from Belleville, Michigan
Eastern Michigan University alumni
Players of American football from Michigan
American football linebackers
Eastern Michigan Eagles football players
Cleveland Browns players
Berlin Thunder players
Denver Broncos players
Buffalo Bills players